Huntingtin-interacting protein 1 also known as HIP-1 is a protein that in humans is encoded by the HIP1 gene.

Hip-1 is a protein that interacts with the huntingtin protein. It is known to contain a domain homologous to the death effector domains (DED) found on proteins involved in apoptosis. It is believed that accumulation of high levels of the free form of this protein (free as in dissociated from the huntingtin and free to bind other key protein(s)) in the cell is one of the mechanisms by which neuron cell death is caused in Huntington's disease (via the caspase-3 route).  The role of Hip-1 in caspase mediated cell death remains unclear.

Discovery 

Huntingtin interacting protein 1 (HIP1) was first identified by Wanker et al. in 1997.

Function 
It has since been found that the CAG expansion seen with  results in decreased binding affinity for HIP1, thus causing disruption of HIP1’s usual function, and also an increase in free HIP1. It is likely that this decreased affinity plays a role in mediating HD pathogenesis, due to loss of cytoskeletal integrity and induction of apoptosis. HIP1’s pro apoptotic effect may involve activation of caspase-8 and a novel HIP1 protein interactor HIPPI. HIP1’s non-pathological activity includes clathrin assembly via interaction with clathrin light chains. HIP1 is the human homologue of Sla2p, a membrane protein in the periphery. Sla2p is an actin-binding protein involved in endocytosis, thus indicating HIP1 in this role. Further details suggesting an important role for Hip-1 in endocytosis comes from binding studies looking at Hip-1 binding to actin. Actin binding by Hip-1 is altered depending on whether clathrin is also bound to Hip-1.

Clinical significance 

HIP1 has also been found to be overexpressed in some cancers including a subset of colorectal and prostate cancers.  This is of specific interest because prostate cancer disease progression involves altered transcription/expression of the androgen receptor (AR).  The AR is a nuclear hormone receptor transcription factor that contains polyglutamine repeats.  In 2005 Mills and colleagues showed that HIP1 is able to regulate transcription of hormone receptors via the androgen response element (ARE) and also alters the rate of degradation of the AR.  It is likely that HIP1 is also able to regulate, or at least interact with proteins that also possess the ARE.

References